This is a list of regiments of the Indian Army as it was following the reorganisation of the Indian Armed Forces in 1922.

Cavalry

Regular

Governor General's Bodyguard
Governor General's Bodyguard, Madras
Governor General's Bodyguard, Bombay
Governor General's Bodyguard, Bengal
 1st Duke of York's Own Skinner's Horse – renamed Skinner's Horse (1st Duke of York's Own) in 1927 – in 1947 went to India and became 1st Horse (Skinner's Horse) in 1950
 2nd Lancers (Gardner's Horse) – renamed 2nd Royal Lancers (Gardner's Horse) in 1937 – in 1947 went to India and became 2nd Lancers (Gardner's Horse) in 1950
 5th/8th Cavalry – formed from merger of 5th Cavalry and 8th Cavalry, became 3rd Cavalry later that year, in 1947 went to India
 9th/10th Cavalry – formed from amalgamation of 9th Hodson's Horse and 10th Duke of Cambridge’s Own Lancers (Hodson’s Horse), renamed 4th Duke of Cambridge's Own Hodson's Horse in 1922, renamed again in 1927 as Hodson's Horse (4th Duke of Cambridge's Own Lancers) – in 1947 went to India and became 4th Horse (Hodon's Horse) in 1950
 11th/12th Cavalry – formed from amalgamation of 11th (King Edward's Own) Lancers (Probyn's Horse) and 12th Cavalry, renamed 5th King Edward's Own Horse later that year, renamed again as Probyn's Horse (5th King Edward's Own) in 1927, renamed once again as Probyn's Horse (5th King Edward VII's Own) in 1937 – in 1947 went to Pakistan and became 5th Horse in 1950
 13th/16th Cavalry – formed from amalgamation of 13th Duke of Connaught's Own Lancers (Watson's Horse) and 16th Cavalry, renamed 6th Duke of Connaught's Own Lancers later that year, renamed again as 6th Duke of Connaught's Own Lancers (Watson's Horse) in 1927 – went to Pakistan in 1947 and became 6th Lancers in 1956
 7th Light Cavalry – formed by redesignation of 28th Light Cavalry – went to India in 1947
 26th/30th King George's Own Light Cavalry – formed from amalgamation of 26th King George's Own Light Cavalry and 30th Lancers (Gordon's Horse), renamed 8th King George's Own Light Cavalry in 1922, renamed again in 8th King George V's Own Light Cavalry in 1937 – went to India in 1947 and became 8th Light Cavalry in 1950
 20th/29th Horse – formed from amalgamation of 20th Deccan Horse and 29th Lancers (Deccan Horse), renamed 9th Royal Deccan Horse later that year, renamed again as The Royal Deccan Horse (9th Horse) in 1927 – went to India in 1947 and became The Deccan Horse in 1950
 10th Queen Victoria's Own Corps of Guides Cavalry (Frontier Force) – formed by separation of the cavalry elements of Queen Victoria's Own Corps of Guides (Frontier Force) (Lumsden), renamed The Guides Cavalry (10th Queen Victoria's Own Frontier Force) in 1927 – went to Pakistan in 1947 and became The Guides Cavalry (Frontier Force) in 1956
 21st/23rd Cavalry – formed by amalgamation of 21st Prince Albert Victor's Own Cavalry (Frontier Force) (Daly's Horse) and 23rd Cavalry (Frontier Force), renamed 11th Prince Albert Victor's Own Cavalry (Frontier Force) in 1922, renamed again as Prince Albert Victor's Own Cavalry (11th Frontier Force) in 1927 – went to Pakistan in 1947 and became 11th Cavalry (Frontier Force) in 1956
 22nd/25th Cavalry – formed by amalgamation of 22nd Sam Browne's Cavalry (Frontier Force) and 25th Cavalry (Frontier Force), renamed 12th Cavalry (Frontier Force) later that year, renamed again as Sam Browne's Cavalry (12th Frontier Force) in 1927 – amalgamated with the 15th Cavalry and 12th Armoured Regiment in 1940 [reformed as 12th Cavalry (Frontier Force) in the Pakistan Army in 1985]
 13th Duke of Connaught's Own Bombay Lancers – formed by amalgamation of 31st Duke of Connaught's Own Lancers and 32nd Lancers, renamed as 13th Duke of Connaught's Own Lancers in 1927 – went to Pakistan in 1947 and became 13th Lancers in 1956
 35th/36th Cavalry – formed by amalgamation of 35th Scinde Horse and 36th Jacob's Horse, renamed as 14th Prince of Wales's Own Scinde Horse later that year, renamed again as The Scinde Horse (14th Prince of Wales's Own Cavalry) in 1927 – went to India in 1947 and became 14th Horse in 1950
 17th/37th Lancers – formed by amalgamation of 17th Cavalry and 37th Lancers (Baluch Horse), renamed as 15th Lancers in 1922, amalgamated with 12th Cavalry in 1940 [reformed in both the Indian and Pakistan Armies in 1985 as the 15th Lancers]
 16th Light Cavalry – formed by redesignation of the 27th Light Cavalry – went to India in 1947
 33rd/34th Cavalry – formed by amalgamation of 33rd Queen's Own Light Cavalry and 34th Prince Albert Victor's Own Poona Horse, renamed as 17th Queen Victoria's Own Poona Horse, renamed again as The Poona Horse (17th Queen Victoria's Own Cavalry) in 1927 – went to India in 1947 and became 17th Horse in 1950
 6th/7th Cavalry – formed by amalgamation of 6th King Edward's Own Cavalry and 7th Hariana Lancers, renamed as 18th King Edward's Own Cavalry later that year, renamed again as 18th King Edward VII's Own Cavalry in 1936 – went to India in 1947 and renamed as 18th Cavalry in 1950
 18th/19th Lancers – formed by amalgamation of 18th King George's Own Lancers and 19th Lancers (Fane's Horse), renamed as 19th King George's Own Lancers in 1927, renamed again as 19th King George V's Own Lancers in 1937 – went to Pakistan in 1947 and renamed as 19th Lancers in 1956
 14th/15th Lancers – formed by amalgamation of 14th Murray's Jat Lancers and 15th Lancers (Cureton's Multanis), renamed as 20th Lancers in 1922, disbanded by 1940 [reformed in 1955/56 in both the Indian and Pakistan Armies as 20th Lancers]
 38th/39th Cavalry – formed by amalgamation of 38th King George's Own Central India Horse and 39th King George's Own Central India Horse, renamed as 38th/39th King George's Own Light Cavalry later that year, renamed again as The Central India Horse (21st King George's Own Horse) in 1923, renamed once again as The Central India Horse (21st King George V's Own Horse) in 1937 – went to India in 1947 and renamed as The Central India Horse in 1950

Auxiliary

The Assam Valley Light Horse 
The Bihar Light Horse
The Bombay Light Horse
The Calcutta Light Horse
The Chota Nagpur Regiment
The Punjab Light Horse
The Southern Provinces Mounted Rifles
The Surma Valley Light Horse
The United Provinces Horse (Northern Regiment)
The United Provinces Horse (Southern Regiment)

Infantry

Regular

 1st Punjab Regiment – went to Pakistan in 1947 and in 1956 united with the 14th, 15th, and 16th Punjab Regiments to form the Punjab Regiment
 1st Battalion – formed by redesignation of 62nd Punjabis
 2nd Battalion – formed by redesignation of 66th Punjabis
 3rd Battalion – formed by redesignation of 76th Punjabis
 4th Battalion – formed by redesignation of 1st Brahmans, disbanded in 1931
 5th Battalion – formed by redesignation of 82nd Punjabis
 10th (Training) Battalion – formed by redesignation of 84th Punjabis
 11th (Territorial) Battalion – formed in 1922, disbanded in 1941
 2nd Punjab Regiment – went to India in 1947 and consequently renamed as The Punjab Regiment
 1st Battalion – formed by redesignation of 1st Battalion, 67th Punjabis, disbanded in 1952
 2nd Battalion – formed by redesignation of 69th Punjabis, disbanded in 1951
 3rd Battalion  – formed by redesignation of 72nd Punjabis
 4th Battalion – formed by redesignation of 74th Punjabis, disbanded in 1938
 5th Battalion – formed by redesignation of 87th Punjabis, disbanded in 1952
 10th (Training) Battalion – formed by redesignation of 2nd Battalion, 67th Punjabis
 3rd Madras Regiment – disbanded in 1928 due to recruiting and economic issues, reformed in 1941 and allocated to India in 1947 as The Madras Regiment
 1st Battalion – formed by redesignation of 73rd Carnatic Infantry, disbanded in 1928
 2nd Battalion – formed by redesignation of 75th Carnatic Infantry, disbanded in 1926
 3rd Battalion – formed by redesignation of 79th Carnatic Infantry, disbanded in 1923
 4th Battalion – formed by redesignation of 83rd Wallajahabad Light Infantry, disbanded in 1923
 10th (Training) Battalion – formed by redesignation of 86th Carnatic Infantry, disbanded in 1926
 11th (Madras) (Territorial) Battalion – disbanded in 1928, reformed in 1933 and disbanded in 1941
 12th (Malabar) (Territorial) Battalion – disbanded in 1928, reformed in 1933 and disbanded in 1941
 13th (Malabar) (Territorial) Battalion – disbanded in 1928, reformed in 1933 and disbanded in 1941
 14th (Coorg) (Territorial) Battalion – disbanded in 1928, reformed in 1929 and disbanded in 1941
 4th Bombay Grenadiers – redesignated as The Indian Grenadiers in 1947 – allocated to India in 1947 and became The Grenadiers in 1950
 1st Battalion – formed by redesignation of 101st Grenadiers – disbanded in 1951
 2nd Battalion – formed by redesignation of 102nd King Edward's Own Grenadiers
 3rd Battalion – formed by redesignation of 108th Infantry – disbanded in 1930, reformed in 1940
 4th Battalion – formed by redesignation of 109th Infantry – disbanded in 1923, reformed in 1941
 5th Battalion – formed by redesignation of 112th Infantry – disbanded in 1923, reformed in 1941 and disbanded again in 1946
 10th (Training) Battalion – formed by redesignation of 113th Infantry – disbanded in 1942
 11th (Territorial) Battalion – disbanded in 1942
 5th Mahratta Light Infantry – redesignated as The Mahratta Light Infantry in 1947 and allocated to India, became The Maratha Light Infantry in 1948
 1st Battalion – formed by redesignation of 103rd Mahratta Light Infantry
 2nd Battalion – formed by redesignation of 105th Mahratta Light Infantry, disbanded in 1942, reformed in 1946
 3rd Battalion – formed by redesignation of 110th Mahratta Light Infantry, disbanded in 1952
 4th Battalion – formed by redesignation of 116th Mahrattas
 5th (Royal) Battalion – formed by redesignation of 117th Mahrattas
 10th (Training) Battalion – formed by redesignation of 114th Mahrattas, disbanded in 1942
 11th (Territorial) Battalion – disbanded in 1941
 12th (Territorial) Battalion – formed in 1939 and disbanded in 1941
 6th Rajputana Rifles – redesignated as The Rajputana Rifles in 1945 and allocated to India in 1947
 1st Battalion (Wellesley's) – formed by redesignation of 104th Wellesley's Rifles, disbanded in 1949
 2nd (Prince of Wales's Own) Battalion – formed by redesignation of 120th Rajputana Infantry
 3rd (Prince of Wales's Own) Battalion – formed by redesignation of 122nd Rajputana Infantry
 4th Battalion (Outram's) – formed by redesignation of 123rd Outram's Rifles
 5th Battalion (Napier's) – formed by redesignation of 125th Napier's Rifles
 10th (Training) Battalion – formed by redesignation of 13th Rajputs (The Shekhawati Regiment)
 11th (Territorial) Battalion – formed in 1928 and disbanded in 1941
 12th (Territorial) Battalion – formed in 1940 and disbanded in 1941
 7th Rajput Regiment – redesignated as The Rajput Regiment in 1945 and allocated to India in 1947
 1st (Queen Victoria's Own Light Infantry) Battalion – formed by redesignation of 2nd Queen Victoria's Own Rajput Light Infantry
 2nd (Prince Albert Victor's) Battalion – formed by redesignation of 4th Prince Albert Victor's Rajputs
 3rd (Duke of Connaught's Own) Battalion – formed by redesignation of 7th Duke of Connaught's Own Rajputs
 4th Battalion – formed by redesignation of 8th Rajputs
 5th Battalion – formed by redesignation of 11th Rajputs, disbanded in 1941
 10th (Training) Battalion – formed by redesignation of 16th Rajputs (The Lucknow Regiment), disbanded in 1943
 11th (Territorial) Battalion – disbanded in 1941
 12th (Territorial) Battalion – formed in 1940 and disbanded in 1941
 8th Punjab Regiment – allocated to Pakistan in 1947 and merged with Baluch Regiment and Bahawalpur Regiment in 1956 to form the Baloch Regiment
 1st Battalion – formed by redesignation of 1st Battalion, 89th Punjabis, disbanded in 1942, reformed in 1946
 2nd Battalion – formed by redesignation of 90th Punjabis
 3rd Battalion – formed by redesignation of 91st Punjabis (Light Infantry)
 4th Battalion – formed by redesignation of 92nd Punjabis
 5th Battalion – formed by redesignation of 93rd Burma Infantry
 10th (Training) Battalion – formed by redesignation of 2nd Battalion, 89th Punjabis, disbanded in 1943
 9th Jat Regiment – redesignated as The Jat Regiment in 1945 and allocated to India in 1947
 1st (Royal) Battalion – formed by redesignation of 1st Battalion, 6th Jat Light Infantry
 2nd (Mooltan) Battalion – formed by redesignation of 119th Infantry (The Mooltan Regiment), disbanded in 1942
 3rd Battalion – formed by redesignation of 10th Jats
 4th Battalion – formed by redesignation of 18th Infantry
 10th (Training) Battalion – formed by redesignation of 2nd Battalion, 6th Jat Light Infantry, disbanded in 1942
 11th (Territorial) Battalion – disbanded in 1941
 12th (Territorial) Battalion – formed in 1940 and disbanded in 1941
 10th Baluch Regiment – redesignated as The Baluch Regiment in 1945 and allocated to Pakistan in 1947 – merged with 8th Punjabs and The Bakawalpur Regiments to form The Baloch Regiment
 1st (Duchess of Connaught's Own) Battalion – formed by redesignation of 1st Battalion, 124th Duchess of Connaught's Own Baluchistan Infantry
 2nd Battalion – formed by redesignation of 126th Baluchistan Infantry, disbanded in 1942, reformed in 1946
 3rd (Queen Mary's Own) Battalion – formed by redesignation of 127th Queen Mary's Own Baluch Light Infantry
 4th (Duke of Connaught's Own) Battalion – formed by redesignation of 129th Duke of Connaught's Own Baluchis
 5th (King George's Own) Battalion (Jacob's Rifles) – formed by redesignation of 130th King George's Own Baluchis (Jacob's Rifles)
 10th (Training) Battalion – formed by redesignation of 2nd Battalion, 124th Duchess of Connaught's Own Baluchistan Infantry, disbanded in 1943
 11th Sikh Regiment – redesignated as The Sikh Regiment in 1945 and allocated to India in 1947
 1st Battalion – formed by redesignation of 14th King George's Own Ferozepore Sikhs
 2nd Battalion – formed by redesignation of 15th Ludhiana Sikhs
 3rd Battalion – formed by redesignation of 45th Rattray's Sikhs
 4th Battalion – formed by redesignation of 36th Sikhs
 5th Battalion – formed by redesignation of 47th Duke of Connaught's Own Sikhs
 10th (Training) Battalion – formed by redesignation of 35th Sikhs
 12th Frontier Force Regiment – redesigned as The Frontier Force Regiment in 1945 and allocated to Pakistan in 1947 – merged with Frontier Force Rifles and Pathan Regiment to form Frontier Force Regiment
 1st Battalion – formed by redesignation of 51st Sikhs (Frontier Force)
 2nd Battalion – formed by redesignation of 52nd Sikhs (Frontier Force), disbanded in 1942, reformed in 1946
 3rd Battalion – formed by redesignation of 53rd Sikhs (Frontier Force)
 4th Battalion – formed by redesignation of 54th Sikhs (Frontier Force), disbanded in 1948
 5th Battalion (Guides) – formed by redesignation of 1st Battalion, Queen Victoria's Own Corps of Guides Infantry (Frontier Force)
 10th (Training) Battalion – formed by redesignation of 2nd Battalion, Queen Victoria's Own Corps of Guides Infantry (Frontier Force)
 11th (Territorial) Battalion – disbanded in 1941
 13th Frontier Force Rifles – redesignated as The Frontier Force Rifles in 1945 and allocated to Pakistan in 1947 – merged with Frontier Force Regiment and Pathan Regiment to form Frontier Force Regiment
 1st Battalion (Coke's) – formed by redesignation of 55th Coke's Rifles (Frontier Force)
 2nd Battalion – formed by redesignation of 1st Battalion, 56th Punjabi Rifles (Frontier Force)
 —no 3rd Battalion was formed—
 4th Battalion (Wilde's) – formed by redesignation of 57th Wilde's Rifles
 5th Battalion (Vaughan's) – formed by redesignation of 58th Vaughan's Rifles (Frontier Force)
 6th (Scinde) Royal Battalion – formed by redesignation of 59th Royal Scinde Rifles (Frontier Force)
 10th (Training) Battalion – formed by redesignation of 2nd Battalion, 56th Punjabi Rifles (Frontier Force)
 11th (Territorial) Battalion – disbanded in 1941
 14th Punjab Regiment – allocated to Pakistan in 1947 – merged with 1st, 15th, and 16th Punjab Regiments to form The Punjab Regiment in 1956
 1st Battalion – formed by redesignation of 19th Punjabis
 2nd (Duke of Cambridge's Own) Battalion – formed by redesignation of 20th Duke of Cambridge's Own Infantry (Brownlow's Punjabis)
 3rd Battalion – formed by redesignation of 22nd Punjabis
 4th Battalion – formed by redesignation of 24th Punjabis
 5th (Pathans) Battalion – formed by redesignation of 40th Pathans
 10th (Training) Battalion – formed by redesignation of 21st Punjabis
 11th (Territorial) Battalion – disbanded in 1941
 12th (Territorial) Battalion – formed in 1939 and disbanded in 1941
 15th Punjab Regiment – allocated to Pakistan in 1947 – merged with 1st, 14th, and 16th Punjab Regiments to form The Punjab Regiment in 1956
 1st Battalion – formed by redesignation of 25th Punjabis
 2nd Battalion – formed by redesignation of 26th Punjabis, disbanded in 1942 and reformed in 1946
 3rd Battalion – formed by redesignation of 27th Punjabis
 4th Battalion – formed by redesignation of 28th Punjabis
 10th (Training) Battalion – formed by redesignation of 29th Punjabis, disbanded in 1943
 11th (Territorial) Battalion – disbanded in 1941
 12th (Territorial) Battalion – formed in 1939 and disbanded in 1941
 16th Punjab Regiment – allocated to Pakistan in 1947 – merged with 1st, 14th, and 15th Punjab Regiments to form The Punjab Regiment in 1956
 1st Battalion – formed by redesignation of 30th Punjabis
 2nd Battalion – formed by redesignation of 31st Punjabis, disbanded in 1942 and reformed in 1946
 3rd Battalion – formed by redesignation of 33rd Punjabis, disbanded in 1942 and reformed in 1946
 4th Battalion – formed by redesignation of 9th Bhopal Infantry
 10th (Training) Battalion – formed by redesignation of 46th Punjabis
 17th Dogra Regiment – redesignated as The Dogra Regiment in 1945, allocated to India in 1947
 Regimental Centre, in Jullunder, Punjab Province
 1st Battalion – formed by redesignation of 37th (Prince of Wales's Own) Dogras
 2nd Battalion – formed by redesignation of 38th Dogras, disbanded in 1942 and reformed in 1946
 3rd Battalion – formed by redesignation of 1st Battalion, 41st Dogras, disbanded in 1942 and reformed in 1946
 —no 4th Battalion until 1940—
 10th (Training) Battalion – formed by redesignation of 2nd Battalion, 41st Dogras, disbanded in 1943
 11th (Territorial) Battalion – disbanded in 1941
 12th (Territorial) Battalion – formed in 1939 and disbanded in 1941
 18th Royal Garhwal Rifles – formed by redesignation of 39th Royal Garhwal Rifles, renamed as The Royal Garhwal Rifles in 1945, allocated to India in 1947 and 'Royal' title dropped in 1950
 Regimental Centre, in Lansdowne, Princely State of Tehri Garhwal
 1st Battalion
 2nd Battalion – disbanded in 1942 and reformed in 1946
 3rd Battalion
 —no 4th Battalion until 1940—
 10th (Training) Battalion – disbanded in 1942
 11th (Territorial) Battalion – disbanded in 1942
 19th Hyderabad Regiment – redesignated as The Kumaon Regiment in 1945, allocated to India in 1947
 Regimental Centre, in Benares
 1st Battalion (Russell's) – formed by redesignation of 94th Russell's Infantry
 2nd (Berar) Battalion – formed by redesignation of 96th Berar Infantry
 3rd Battalion – formed by redesignation of 97th Deccan Infantry — disbanded in 1931
 4th Battalion – formed by redesignation of 98th Infantry — disbanded in 1942
 5th Battalion – formed by redesignation of 99th Deccan Infantry — disbanded in 1924, reformed in 1940 and disbanded again in 1946
 10th (Training) Battalion (Russell's) – formed by redesignation of 95th Russell's Infantry
 1st Kumaon Rifles – formed by redesignation of 1st Battalion, 50th Kumaon Rifles
 2nd Kumaon Rifles – formed by redesignation of 2nd Battalion, 50th Kumaon Rifles — disbanded in 1923
 11th (Territorial) Battalion – formed in 1922 and disbanded in 1941
20th Burma Rifles — allocated to Burma on separation from India in 1937
Regimental Centre, in Maymyo
1st Battalion – formed by redesignation of 1st Battalion, 70th Burma Rifles — disbanded in 1942, reformed in 1945
2nd Battalion – formed by redesignation of 2nd Battalion, 70th Burma Rifles
3rd (Kachin) Battalion – formed by redesignation of 1st Battalion, 85th Burman Rifles
4th (Chin) Battalion – formed by redesignation of 2nd Battalion, 85th Burma Rifles
10th (Training) Battalion — disbanded in 1937, reformed in 1940 but disbanded again in 1942
11th (Territorial) Battalion — disbanded in 1942
12th (Territorial) Battalion — disbanded in 1942
 1st King George V's Own Gurkha Rifles (The Malaun Regiment) — allocated to India in 1947, became 'Gorkha' in 1949, and finally 1st Gorkha Rifles (The Malaun Regiment) in 1950
 Home Station, in Dharamsala
 1st Battalion
 2nd Battalion
 3rd Battalion — raised in 1917 but disbanded in 1921, reformed in 1940 and disbanded again in 1946
 2nd King Edward VII's Own Gurkha Rifles (The Sirmoor Rifles) — allocated to the United Kingdom in 1947
 Home Station, in Dehradun
 1st Battalion
 2nd Battalion — disbanded in 1942, reformed in 1946
 3rd Battalion — raised in 1917 but disbanded in 1920, reformed in 1940 and disbanded again in 1946
 3rd Queen Alexandra's Own Gurkha Rifles — allocated to India in 1947, became 'Gorkha' in 1949, and finally 3rd Gorkha Rifles in 1950
 Home Station, in Almora and Lansdowne
 1st Battalion
 2nd Battalion
 3rd Battalion — raised in 1917 but disbanded in 1920, reformed in 1940
 4th Battalion — raised in 1916 but disbanded in 1922, reformed in 1941 and disbanded again in 1947
 4th Prince of Wales's Own Gurkha Rifles — allocated to India in 1947, became 'Gorkha' in 1949, and finally 4th Gorkha Rifles in 1950
 Home Station, in Bakloh
 1st Battalion
 2nd Battalion
 3rd Battalion — formed in 1940
 5th Royal Gurkha Rifles (Frontier Force) — allocated to India in 1947, became 'Gorkha' in 1949, and finally 5th Gorkha Rifles in 1950
 Home Station, in Abbottabad
 1st Battalion
 2nd Battalion
 3rd Battalion — raised in 1916 but disbanded in 1921, reformed in 1940
 6th Gurkha Rifles — allocated to the United Kingdom in 1947, became 6th Queen Elizabeth's Own Gurkha Rifles in 1959
 Home Station, in Abbottabad
 1st Battalion
 2nd Battalion
 3rd Battalion — raised in 1917 but disbanded in 1921, reformed in 1940 and disbanded again in 1948
 7th Gurkha Rifles — allocated to the United Kingdom in 1947, became 7th Duke of Edinburgh's Own Gurkha Rifles in 1959
 Home Station, in Quetta
 1st Battalion
 2nd Battalion
 3rd Battalion — raised in 1917 but disbanded in 1921, reformed in 1940 and disbanded again in 1943, reformed once more in 1946 but disbanded two years later in 1948
 8th Gurkha Rifles — allocated to India in 1947, became 'Gorkha' in 1949
 Home Station, in Quetta and Shillong
 1st Battalion
 2nd Battalion
 3rd Battalion — raised in 1917 but disbanded in 1921, reformed in 1940 and disbanded again in 1946
 9th Gurkha Rifles — allocated to India in 1947, became 'Gorkha' in 1949
 Home Station, in Dehradun
 1st Battalion
 2nd Battalion
 10th Gurkha Rifles — allocated to the United Kingdom in 1947, became 10th Princess Mary's Own Gurkha Rifles in 1949
 Home Headquarters, in Quetta
 1st Battalion
 2nd Battalion

Auxiliary Force (India)

The Allahabad Rifles 
The Assam Bengal Railway Battalion 
The Baluchistan Volunteer Rifle Corps 
The Bangalore Contingent 
The Bengal & North West Railway Battalion 
The Bengal Nagpur Railway Battalion 
The Bombay, Baroda and Central India Railway Regiment
The Bombay Volunteer Rifles Corps
The Burma Railways Battalion
The Calcutta and Presidency Battalion
The Calcutta Presidency Battalion
The Calcutta Scottish
The Cawnpore Rifles
The Coorg and Mysore Company
The Delhi Contingent
The East Coast Battalion
The East Indian Railway Regiment
The Eastern Bengal Company
The Eastern Bengal Railway Battalion
The Great Indian Peninsula Railway Regiment
The Hyderabad Rifles
The Lucknow Rifles
The Lucknow Volunteer Rifles
The Madras and Southern Mahratta Railway Rifles
The Madras Guards 
The Mussourie Battalion
The Nagpur Rifles
The Naini Tal Volunteer Rifles
 The Nilgiri Malabar Battalion
The Northern Bengal Mounted Rifles
The North Western Railway Battalion
The Oudh and Rohilkhand Railway Battalion
The Poona Rifles
The Punjab Rifles
The Rangoon Battalion
The Simla Rifles
The Sind Rifles
The South Indian Railway Battalion
The Tenasserim Battalion
The Upper Burma Battalion

Indian Mountain Artillery 
Following the absorption of the Presidency armies into the Royal Artillery and Royal Horse Artillery, there was no 'field' units of the Indian artillery.  The Indian artillery only maintained mountain artillery units, while the Royal Artillery provided the other arms.  The units below have their titles in 1922 or those used before if they were changed later;

Brigades (till 1938)/Regiments

 20th Indian Pack Artillery Brigade
 21st Indian Pack Artillery Brigade
 22nd Indian Pack Artillery Brigade
 23rd Indian Pack Artillery Brigade
 24th Indian Pack Artillery Brigade
 25th Indian Pack Artillery Brigade

Batteries (Separate)

 101 Royal (Kohat) Pack Battery (Frontier Force)
 102 (Derajat) Pack Battery (FF)
 103 (Peshawar) Pack Battery (FF)
 104 (Hazara) Pack Battery (FF)
 105 (Bombay) Pack Battery 
 106 (Jacob's) Pack Battery 
 107 (Bengal) Pack Battery 
 108 (Lahore) Pack Battery 
 109 (Murree) Pack Battery 
 110 (Abbottabad) Pack Battery 
 111 (Dehra Dun) Pack Battery 
 112 (Poonch) Pack Battery 
 113 (Dardoni) Pack Battery 
 114 (Rajputana) Pack Battery 
 115 (Jhelum) Pack Battery 
 116 (Zhob) Pack Bty
 117 (Nowshera) Pack Battery 
 118 (Sohan) Pack Battery 
 119 (Maymyo) Pack Battery

Indian Territorial Force

University Training Corps
Urban Infantry

The Frontier Corps
Gilgit Scouts
Chitral Scouts
Kurram Militia
Tochi Scouts
South Waziristan Scouts
Zhob Militia
Pishin Scouts (1946–47)
Khyber Rifles

Military Police and North-East Frontier units
Malabar Special Police
Burma Military Police
Eastern Frontier Rifles (Bengal Military Police)
Assam Rifles

Services

The Army Bearer Corps
The Army Clothing Department
The Army Hospital Corps
The Army Remount Department
The Army Veterinary Corps 
The Indian Medical Department
The Indian Ordnance Department
The Military Farms Department
Supply and Transport Corps

Support Arms

1st King George V's Own Bengal Sappers and Miners (numeral omitted 1923) 
2nd Queen Victoria's Own Madras Sappers and Miners (numeral omitted 1923)
3rd Royal Bombay Sappers and Miners (numeral omitted 1923)
4th Burma Sappers and Miners (numeral omitted 1923)
1st Madras Pioneers
2nd Bombay Pioneers
3rd Sikh Pioneers
4th Hazara Pioneers

Indian State Forces
(see separately)

Wartime Units and others formed between 1922 and 1947

Field Artillery
Women's Army Corps (India)
42nd Cavalry
43rd Cavalry
44th Cavalry
45th Cavalry
46th Cavalry
47th Cavalry
48th Cavalry
Indian Long Range Squadron
21st Regiment
22nd Regiment
23rd Regiment
24th Regiment
25th Ajmer Regiment
Kumaon Rifles
151 (British) Parachute Battalion
152 (Indian) Parachute Battalion
153 (Gurkha) Parachute Battalion
154 (Gurkha) Parachute Battalion
Indian Parachute Regiment
Indian Ordnance and Mechanical Engineers
Indian Hospital Corps formed by amalgamation of Army Hospital and Nursing Corps and the Army Bearer Corps
Indian Medical Service formed by amalgamation of the Bengal, Bombay and Madras Medical Services
Indian Army Medical Corps formed by amalgamation of the Indian Medical Service, Indian Medical Department, and Indian Hospital Corps

See also
List of regiments of the Indian Army (1903)
List of regiments of the Indian Army
Royal Engineers Museum Indian Sappers (1740–1947)

References 

 

Regiments (1922)